Oh-seong, also spelled Oh-sung, is a Korean masculine given name. Its meaning differs based on the hanja used to write each syllable of the name. There are 33 hanja with the reading "oh" and 27 hanja with the reading "seong" on the South Korean government's official list of hanja which may be registered for use in given names; they are listed in the table at right (four are not displayed due to encoding issues).

People with this name include:
Yu Oh-seong (born 1968), South Korean actor
Kim Oh-sung (born 1986), South Korean footballer

See also
List of Korean given names

References

Korean masculine given names